The It Girl is the second studio album by English Britpop band Sleeper, released in May 1996 (see 1996 in music). It was their most successful album, selling over 300,000 copies in the UK alone. The album was released internationally; the US version has a different track listing along with alternative photos in the liner booklet. It was recorded in London over the winter of 1995 and 1996.

Critical reception 

Jack Rabid of AllMusic wrote that while "nothing is quite the total knockout of Smarts 'Inbetweener,' The It Girl is more consistently accomplished, with a broader palette of influences".

Track listing 
All lyrics written by Louse Wener.

Notes
 Bonus disc: Tracks 1–5 taken from the "What Do I Do Now" single b-sides; 6–8 from "Sale of the Century" single; 9–11 from "Nice Guy Eddie" single; 12–16 from "Statuesque" single.

Personnel
Personnel per booklet.

Sleeper
 Louise Wener – vocals, guitar
 Andy Maclure – drums, acoustic guitar, percussion, keyboards (track 11)
 Jon Stewart – guitar, keyboards (track 1)
 Diid Osman – bass

Additional musicians
 Stephen Street – keyboards, programming
 John Green – piano, synthesizers

Production and design
 Stephen Street – producer (all except track 1), mixing (track 1)
 John Smith – engineer, producer (track 12)
 Bruce Lampcov – producer (track 1)
 Tom Girling – assistant engineer
 Julie Gardner – assistant engineer
 Kevin Westenberg – Sleeper photography

References

External links 

The It Girl at YouTube (streamed copy where licensed)
Complete Sleeper discography

1996 albums
Sleeper (band) albums
Albums produced by Stephen Street